Bill Purdie (24 June 1910 – 22 November 1997) was a Scotland international rugby union player.

Rugby Union career

Amateur career

He played for Jed-Forest.

Provincial career

He turned out for the South of Scotland District in 1931. The Jedburgh Gazette of 13 January 1939 stating:
It eight years since he turned out in his first representative match, filling a vacancy in the South team at the last moment, when J. Beattie, Hawick, had to withdraw, and, according to the Gazette files, a daily paper critic described hint as "one of the best forwards on the field" that day. Strangely enough, another critic said practically the same about hint after the Selkirk trial a few weeks ago. Purdie has led the Jedforest team on four occasions and has all along been a whole-hearted club player, so it would set the seal on a splendid football career were he to be "capped."

He was capped for Whites Trial on 17 December 1938.

After a good showing, he then played for Scotland Probables in the final trial that season.

International career
He was capped 3 times for Scotland in 1939.

References

1910 births
1997 deaths
Scottish rugby union players
Scotland international rugby union players
Rugby union props
Jed-Forest RFC players
Scotland Probables players
Whites Trial players
South of Scotland District (rugby union) players
Rugby union players from Jedburgh